Tabaco, officially the City of Tabaco, is a 4th class component city in the province of Albay, Philippines. According to the 2020 census, it has a population of 140,961 people.

It is one of the three component cities of the province, along with Legazpi and Ligao. The mainland part of the city is bordered by the town of Malinao to the north, the towns of Polangui and Oas to the west, Ligao to the southwest, Malilipot town to the southeast, and Lagonoy Gulf to the east. The symmetric Mayon Volcano, the most active volcano in the Philippines, lies south of the city. Tabaco is one of the eight towns and cities that share jurisdiction on the volcano, dividing the peak like slices of a pie when viewed from above.

The island of San Miguel, the westernmost of the four main islands in Lagonoy Gulf, falls under the jurisdiction of Tabaco. Five of the barangays of the city are located on the island for a total of 47 barangays composing the city.

Etymology
According to native stories, the "Legend of Tabaco" was about a lost foreigner who asked the locals what the name of the place is all about. However a confused and frightened native whom the lost foreigner asked didn't understand what the lost foreigner was asking. The native screamed "Tabak ko!" meaning "My bolo" insinuating a person to get his tabak(presumably for defense). The lost foreigner assumed that the native understood what he asked, then thought the name of the place is Tabaco.

It is not true that Tabaco got its name from "Tabak ko" which means "my bolo", but from tobacco (in Spanish "Tabaco"), a primary product of the city in the Hispanic period. Nevertheless, the Official Seal of the city was still conceived from the "Tabak Ko" legend and was officially adopted through Municipal Council Resolution No. 29 on February 23, 1966.

History

Spanish period
According to the Estado Geografico Estadistico Historico written in 1805 by Father De Huerta, the recorded history of the city began in 1587 through the missionary work of the first Franciscan Fathers. In 1616, Fr. Pedro De Alcareso became the first permanent parish priest and established a church dedicated to St. John the Baptist, the patron saint of the city.

The first inhabitants settled along the seashore and engaged in fishing and superfun farming. Due to the continuous attacks by the Moro raiders, the natives migrated to San Vicente and San Carlos, and started the foundation of the first poblacion in 1703, while the fishermen of the town transferred to the shores of the bay of what is now known as Barangay Cormidal. Under the administration of the first town executive, a church was built in Cormidal in 1731. Records on the elected Capitan municipal (town mayor) started only in 1731 with Martin Aguirre listed as the first mayor of Tabaco.

In 1811, a terrible typhoon called Baguiong Oguis or White Typhoon brought havoc to the town. This was followed in 1814 by the most destructive eruption of the Mayon Volcano, which showered the areas with ashes and stone. These two events rendered many residents homeless and left the fields unproductive for many years after. It took a full decade for the people to recover, at which time they built a cemetery and laid the foundation of the present church which was completed in 17 years.

American period and independence
The Americans landed at Tabaco on February 9, 1900, under the command of Col. Walter Howe. Despite the well-documented courage and patriotism of the Tabaqueños, the residents of Tabaco, the superior armaments and well-trained soldiers of the American army hastened its conquest of Tabaco and adjoining towns, starting the American rule in the area.

With the restoration of peace after World War II, the Tabaqueños started rebuilding their lives and their land. By the time the Philippines gained independence in 1946, Tabaco was once again a thriving town.

Other catastrophic events
Another catastrophe to hit the town was Typhoon Trix in 1952, which completely submerged Natunawan Island. A 1964 fire razed the commercial center, and in 1970, another destructive storm, Typhoon Sening, slashed through the town.

Cityhood

Then Representative Krisel Lagman-Luistro introduced House Bill No. 7851, upgrading the municipality of Tabaco into a component city of the Province of Albay. Senate Bill No. 2244 was sponsored by Senators Sergio Osmeña III and Franklin Drilon as its counterpart in the Senate. The Republic Act No. 9020 converted the Municipality of Tabaco into a component city of the Province of Albay. It was signed into law by President Gloria Macapagal Arroyo on February 5, 2001. The municipality was finally converted into a city after the plebiscite conducted on March 4, 2001.

Geography

Climate

The City of Tabaco belongs to the Type II climate of the Philippines. It is characterized by no distinct dry season but with a very pronounced maximum rainfall from November to January.

Barangays
Tabaco City is politically subdivided into 47 barangays. There are sixteen coastal barangays, five on the island of San Miguel and eleven in the mainland of the city. San Pedro became a barrio in 1952.

Demographics

Language and dialect
Bicolano is the primary language in Tabaco and the region. The majority of people speak the Tabaqueño Dialect derived from Coastal Bicol. Although Bicolano Viejo is also spoken, it has fallen out of mainstream use and has since been reduced to the status of sociolect as only very few members of Tabaco's oldest and more affluent families still use it. As in most parts of The Philippines, Filipino and English are spoken and afforded official language status. Spanish, Hiligaynon, Cebuano, Arabic, Cantonese, Hokkien and Mandarin are also spoken owing to Tabaco's significant migrant and mestizo populations.

Religion
Christianity is the predominant religion with Roman Catholicism with the most number of practitioners. Other Christian denominations are also present in the city like Protestants, Baptist, Philippine Independent Church, United Pentecostal Church, Evangelical Christian and Iglesia ni Cristo. Islam, Mormonism, Hinduism, Jainism, Wicca, Modern Paganism and Buddhism also have followers in the city.

Economy

Agriculture
Its economy is still heavily dependent on agriculture. Major crops include rice, corn, cacao, pili, root crops, vegetables, coconuts and abacá. Poultry and livestock raising as well as aquaculture and fishing are very much alive.

International seaport

Tabaco today is rapidly growing with a thriving commercial center and port area. The city has the sole International Seaport in the region contributing to the city's vibrant economy.

Local fishport
Situated in Barangay Fatima and San Roque. Which serves as the trading area of products ( fisheries, livestock, variety of fruits and vegetables, woods and charcoals), from neighboring islands in San Miguel, Bacacay, and Rapu-Rapu.

Other industries

Woodcraft. Wood furniture and accessories manufacturing.
Metal Craft. Tabak (bolo knife) manufacturing or cutlery, scissors, razors, farm implements, window grills, iron gates and tricycle sidecars
Rattan Craft. Furniture and fixtures made from rattan.
Ceramics Industry. Hollow blocks, toilet bowls, floor tiles, and reinforced concrete pipes.
Hat & Mat weaving from Paraguay leaves.
Ship Repair and Building. Dry dock facility is available in Barangay Salvacion.
Padyak(Pedicab), Trucks, Bus and AUV Manufacturing (Body Building)

Tourism

Places of interest
The Church of San Juan Bautista in San Juan, Tabaco City, is one of the most impressive religious structures in the province of Albay. The construction of the present church started in 1750. It was designated a National Historic Landmark by PD. 260 on August 1, 1973.

Beaches and resorts:

Historical:
Angela Manalang Gloria Ancestral House at Quinale

Educational:
Mayon Planetarium and Science Park in Buang is a planetarium with library, the virtual room, a mini-museum and an audiovisual hall.
San Miguel Island Marine Fishery Reserve located in Sagurong, San Miguel Island.

Institutions:
Tabaco Port (International Port of Entry)
Mayon Skyline Hotel and Convention Center in Buang. Formerly known as Mayon Resthouse, it is located on the northern slope of Mayon Volcano.

Events and festival
Charter Day or the Founding Anniversary of Tabaco as a city is celebrated yearly on March 24.
 Tabak Festival is a week-long celebration showcasing the city's cutlery industry. It is held the third week of March culminating with the founding anniversary of Tabaco.
City Fiesta. In honor of the patron saint of Tabaco, St. John the Baptist, the city Fiesta is celebrated on June 24.

Transportation

Roads
Roads are good in Tabaco and they are classified as follows:
National roads – 
Provincial roads – 
Municipal roads – 
Barangay roads –

Airport

Seaport
The Port of Tabaco City is one of the ports of entry open to overseas shipping in the province of Albay. It also serves as a passenger and cargo movement facility to the islands of San Miguel, Cagraray, Batan and Rapu-Rapu as well as the provinces of Catanduanes and Camarines Sur. The main Sea Transportation operators in the port are:
M/V Eugenia
M/V Regina Calixta 2,3 and 4

Buses
There are regular transportation to and from Manila and to the other main cities in the Bicol Region.

Others
There are 632 Registered motorized tricycles with routes to different barangays and neighboring municipalities.
There are over 2,000 Pedicabs for transportation within the poblacion.
There are several jeepney routes around the city or anywhere in the province.

Education

Secondary school

Tertiary, vocational, technical schools

Public services
 Waste Disposal
In dealing with solid waste management, the City of Tabaco has adopted the usual means of dumping garbage in an open-pit dumpsite. Garbage is collected from each barangay in the Poblacion daily. The city has four garbage trucks and four compactors to ensure that the garbage is collected and disposed of in the waste disposal site located at Pinagbobong, about  distance from the central business district.

 Fire protection
The Tabaco City Fire Station, Bureau of Fire Protection is located on Ziga Ave. A total of fifteen fire officers serve in the local fire department, including the City Fire Marshall.
The local mall (LCC) has its volunteer fire brigade that helps the fire department in extending its services to the residents of Tabaco.
Tabaco Chinese-Filipino Volunteer Fire Brigade.

Police and law enforcement
 Tabaco Police Force The Philippine National Police (PNP)  Tabaco City Station is staffed by five police officers and seventy-five police NCOs (non-commissioned officers), located at Llorente St., at the back of the City Hall, headed by Police Chief Superintendent Jose Lipa Capinpin. Police headquarters is now located in front of the Central Terminal, Pawa, Tabaco City

 PNP CID Regional Office Assisting the city police in its drive against criminality is the PNP Criminal Investigation & Detection Group Tabaco Regional Sub-Office. The station is under the direct command of the Provincial Officer and serves the first district of Albay.

The jail structure is composed of six (6) operation cells, staffed by two BJMP officers and twenty non-officer ranks.

Utilities
 Power
Two power companies provide electricity to the city.
 Albay Power Electric Cooperative (APEC) a Concessionaire of Albay Electric Cooperative, Inc. (ALECO) in Matagbac, Tabaco City serves 35 of the 47 barangays of the town or 74% of the city.
 ASCO-Tabaco, located in A.A. Berces Street, San Juan, Tabaco City serves the rest of the city.????

 Water
Water supply is managed by the Tabaco Water District (TAWAD) located in Karangahan Blvd. Tabaco City. Its present service area encompasses the Poblacion and 21 other barangays, serving about 25,000 people in 2,933 households presently connected to the system.

Notable Person
• Henry Omaga-Diaz,  journalism.

References

External links

 [ Philippine Standard Geographic Code]
Tabaco City profile on the Albay official website
Albay Province Official Tourism Site

Cities in Albay
Populated places established in 1731
1731 establishments in the Philippines
Port cities and towns in the Philippines
Component cities in the Philippines